Parectopa lithocolletina is a moth of the family Gracillariidae. It is known from Colombia.

References

Gracillariinae